"Milky Way" is a song by Syd Barrett from the outtakes/rarities album Opel. The song was recorded on 7 June 1970, and produced by Barrett's friend and former bandmate David Gilmour. It was one of eight then-unreleased tracks to be released on Opel.

References

1988 songs
Syd Barrett songs
Songs written by Syd Barrett
Song recordings produced by David Gilmour